David Marrero and Pablo Santos were the defending champions of the Copa Sevilla men's doubles tennis tournament. They chose to compete this year, but were eliminated by Enrico Burzi and Pavol Červenák already in the first round.
Treat Conrad Huey and Harsh Mankad defeated Alberto Brizzi and Simone Vagnozzi 6–1, 7–5 in the final and won € 2,650 in prize money and 80 ranking points..

Seeds

Draw

Draw

References
 Doubles draw

2009
Doubles